Kofi James (born 23 December 1997) is an Antiguan cricketer. He made his List A debut for the Leeward Islands in the 2017–18 Regional Super50 on 12 February 2018. In October 2019, he was named in the Leeward Islands' squad for the 2019–20 Regional Super50 tournament. He made his first-class debut on 15 February 2022, for the Leeward Islands in the 2021–22 West Indies Championship.

References

External links
 

1997 births
Living people
Place of birth missing (living people)
Leeward Islands cricketers
Antigua and Barbuda cricketers